Attack of the Killer Hog is a 2000  Argentine horror film directed and written by Agustín Cavalieri and Marcos Meroni. The film premiered in December 2000 in Buenos Aires and was released also in Germany with an 18 certificate by Epix Media.

Cast
 Agustín Cavalieri
 Diego Contreras
 Diego Ferraro
 Gabriel Grieco
 Soledad Irusta
 Marcos Meroni
 Juan Dardo Moreira
 Christian Diego Palazzo
 Verónica Pelaccini
 Horacio Trenado

External links
 

2000 horror films
2000 films
2000s Spanish-language films
2000s German-language films
Argentine horror films
2000s Argentine films